The Minister of the Economic Development Agency of Canada for the Regions of Quebec is the member of the Cabinet of Canada who also serves as the chief executive of the Economic Development Agency of Canada for the Regions of Quebec.

Prior to 2004, the portfolio was considered an add-on responsibility for a full Cabinet minister with other responsibilities, usually the Industry Minister.  It was consequently termed the Minister responsible for the Economic Development Agency of Canada for the Regions of Quebec.

Related regional development posts included Minister for the Atlantic Canada Opportunities Agency, Minister of the Federal Economic Development Initiative for Northern Ontario and Minister of Western Economic Diversification.

The post was vacant since 2015, with the last minister to hold this post being Denis Lebel. The post was abolished in 2021, with the Minister responsible for the Economic Development Agency of Canada for the Regions of Quebec portfolio being revived to take its place.

Ministers
Key:

 

Prior to 2004 and since 2021, responsibilities for this portfolio were handled by cabinet minister with another primary office, termed the Minister responsible for the Economic Development Agency of Canada for the Regions of Quebec (List).

Economic Development Agency